Ventriloquism is speaking through an object

Ventriloquism may also refer to:
Ventriloquism (album)

See also
Ventriloquist (disambiguation)